Xinyu (formerly ), is a prefecture-level city in west-central Jiangxi province, People's Republic of China.

History

Geography
It has a four-season, monsoon-influenced humid subtropical climate. It can be very hot and rainy in summer. The city's main industry is the XinYu steel plant, which dominates the area.

Climate

Administration 
Xinyu has direct jurisdiction over 1 urban district, scenic district, 1 development zone, 1 county, 17 towns, 15 townships, 2 sub-districts, 446 villages, and 51 communities.

Urban District: 
Yushui District

County: 
Fenyi County

Scenic District:
Xiannühu (Fairy Lake) Scenic District

Development Zone:
Gaoxin Technical & Economic Development Zone

Tourism
Xinyu is known for the scenery and cultural sites of Xiannühu. The legend of Dong Yong and the Seventh Fairy has been passed down until now. Their love story took place at today's Xiannühu (Fairy Lake).

Colleges and universities
Xinyu University

International relations

Friendship cities
   Coquitlam, British Columbia, Canada
   Bangalore, Karnataka, India

References

External links
Official Xinyu city website (Chinese)

Cities in Jiangxi
National Forest Cities in China
Prefecture-level divisions of Jiangxi
Xinyu